On 12 October 1992, the Provisional Irish Republican Army (IRA) detonated a bomb that had been planted in the gents' toilets in the Sussex Arms pub in Upper St Martins Lane near Long Acre, London, killing a man and injuring seven other people.

A telephone call to a radio station was made at 1:21 pm, nine minutes before the bomb exploded, saying a bomb had been placed "in the Leicester Square area"; a tourist-frequented spot nearby.

The bomb exploded at 1:30pm, injuring eight people. One of the wounded - thirty-year-old nurse David Heffer - died from his injuries in hospital. It was the eighth IRA bomb in London in a six day period.

It was the first IRA pub bombing in England to kill people since the November 1974 Birmingham pub bombings, and the first IRA pub bombing in Britain causing injuries since the Hare and Hounds pub bombing in Lower Boxley Road in Kent in September 1975, when two police officers were injured in an IRA car bombing.

See also
Chronology of Provisional Irish Republican Army actions (1992–1999)

References

1992 in London
1992 murders in the United Kingdom
1990s building bombings
1990s in the City of Westminster
1990s murders in London
Attacks on bars in the United Kingdom
Attacks on buildings and structures in 1992
Building bombings in London
Crime in the City of Westminster
Improvised explosive device bombings in 1992
October 1992 crimes
October 1992 events in the United Kingdom
Provisional IRA bombings in London
Terrorist incidents in London in the 1990s
Terrorist incidents in the United Kingdom in 1992